Ephedrophila jordanalis is a species of snout moth in the genus Ephedrophila. It was described by Hans Rebel in 1902. It is found in Jordan and Egypt.

References

Epipaschiinae
Moths described in 1902